The High Commissioner of Bangladesh to the Republic of United Kingdom is the chief diplomatic representative of Bangladesh to United Kingdom.

List of High Commissioners of Bangladesh to the United Kingdom

Saida Muna Tasneem (since 30 November 2018)
 Md. Nazmul Quaunine (July 2014 – 29 November 2018)
 Mohamed Mijarul Quayes (9 December 2012 – July 2014)
 M. Sayeedur Rahman Khan (2009–2012)
 Shafi U Ahmed (2007–2009)
 Rezaul Karim (?–1992)
 Mir Shawkat Ali (27 July 1986 – 30 July 1987)
 Fakhruddin Ahmed (May 1982 – July 1986)
 Abul Fateh (1976–1977)
 Syed Abdus Sultan (1972–1976)

References

 
United Kingdom
Bangladesh